The following is an incomplete list of Australian Army brigadiers and other senior Australian Army officers. (There is a separate list of Australian Army generals.)

Ranks
An Australian Army brigadier is not classed as a "general", whereas an Australian Army brigadier general was. The senior Australian Army ranks are:
Senior Officer: brigadier.
General: brigadier general, major general, lieutenant general, general.
Marshal: field marshal.

Background
The British Army replaced the rank of brigadier general with colonel-commandant in 1922, and then with brigadier in 1928. The rank insignia was changed from crossed sabre and baton to crown with three stars ("pips") to reflect that a brigadier is a senior colonel rather than a junior general. The Cadet Instructor's Handbook (2006), page 104 states:

List

See also 
 List of Australian admirals and commodores
 List of Australian air marshals
 :Category:Australian generals
 :Category:Australian brigadiers
 :Category:Royal Australian Navy admirals
 :Category:Royal Australian Air Force air marshals

References 
Footnotes

Citations

External links 
 Australian Generals of WWII at www.generals.dk

Australian Army

Australian generals and brigadiers
Generals